The 1982 Purdue Boilermakers football team represented Purdue University during the 1982 Big Ten Conference football season. Led by first-year head coach Leon Burtnett, the Boilermakers compiled an overall record of 3–8 with a mark of 3–6 in conference play, placing seventh in the Big Ten. Purdue played home games at Ross–Ade Stadium in West Lafayette, Indiana.

Schedule

Roster

Game summaries

Stanford

Minnesota

at Notre Dame

Wisconsin

at Illinois

Northwestern

    
    
    
    
    
    
    
    

Mel Gray 25 rushes, 193 yards (career-high)

at Michigan State
 Scott Campbell 24/43, 324 yards

Iowa

at Ohio State
 Scott Campbell 28/55, 333 yards

at Michigan
 Scott Campbell 29/49, 331 yards

References

Purdue
Purdue Boilermakers football seasons
Purdue Boilermakers football